Daniel Matsau (born 18 January 1977) is a South African former footballer. He competed in the men's tournament at the 2000 Summer Olympics.

References

External links
 

1977 births
Living people
South African soccer players
South Africa international soccer players
Olympic soccer players of South Africa
Footballers at the 2000 Summer Olympics
People from Matjhabeng Local Municipality
Association football forwards
Soccer players from the Free State (province)
Kaizer Chiefs F.C. players
Bloemfontein Celtic F.C. players
Hellenic F.C. players
SuperSport United F.C. players
Mpumalanga Black Aces F.C. players
Moroka Swallows F.C. players